Yuno may refer to:

People
, Japanese middle-distance runner

Characters
Yuno (Black Clover), a character in the manga series Black Clover
Yuno, protagonist of the manga series Hidamari Sketch
Yuno Gasai, a character in the manga series Future Diary

Other
Yuno Station, a railway station in Fukuyama, Hiroshima Prefecture, Japan

Japanese feminine given names